CM.com (formerly called CM Telecom) is a mobile services company based in the Netherlands. The company was formed in 1999, and provides software for direct messaging, VoIP messaging, ecommerce payments and digital identification.

In recent years, CM has acquired a number of messaging and media startups. CM.com was the main sponsor of football club NAC Breda from 2015 to 2020.

History
CM.com was founded in February 1999 by Jeroen van Glabbeek and Gilbert Gooijers. In the company's first year, it was known as ClubMessage B.V. The company's main product at the time GroupText, used by event organisers to distribute information to clubbers and event attendees. The software was predominantly used across the Benelux by large nightlife venues to promote their nights and DJ events.

As the company grew, they began to operate in other event sectors, such as music festivals. During the next couple of years, the company focused on the expansion of its SMS messaging service, and created and patented the software MailText. In recent years, CM has diversified into the mobile payments market, with the launch of CM Payments Worldwide.

In September 2013, CM.com acquired Dutch mobile app developer OneSixty Mobile B.V. with offices in 's-Hertogenbosch and London, enabling its initial physical presence in the UK.

In early 2015 it was announced that the company would be opening offices in both Paris and London. During the same year, CM received coverage on The Next Web for their growing innovations in media messaging. Their solution for managing push message campaigns, where companies or app developers can measure and drive interaction with their users. Firstly push messages are sent using the CM solution. Customers can then be automatically contacted by SMS if the push notification goes unread.

In March 2016, CM.com acquired GlobalMessaging, which was based in Peterborough, England. Around the same time, the company also acquired the mobile app developer, .

In July 2017, CM.com took over payment institution  Payments from its American owner Ingram Micro. In the same month, the company revealed a new visual identity, logo and name change.

Market & products
As part of the instant messaging market, CM has predominantly focused on backend solutions. The mobile services company and others similar have been at the forefront of mobile messaging solutions over the last decade, and the rise of what is often referred to as the messaging economy.

CM has become known for their work in the market of hybrid messaging. This type of messaging means that customers can be contacted using a variety of messaging formats. It allows the sender to contact its customers through more than one messaging format.

In 2016, they launched a real-time analytics tool for mobile. The web tool provides insights in messaging traffic and conversions to customers.

References

Mobile telecommunications
Mobile technology companies
VoIP companies
Cloud communication platforms
Dutch companies established in 1999